The Horribly Slow Murderer with the Extremely Inefficient Weapon is a 10-minute short film that was released in 2008. It was filmed entirely in California over the course of 22 days. It was written, directed, and narrated by Richard Gale.

The film won the Special Jury Prize at the Fantastic Fest, the Best Short Film award at the Fantasia International Film Festival, and the Citizen's Choice Award and the Grand Prize for Short Film at the Puchon International Fantastic Film Festival, and was named the Best Short Film of 2009 by Rue Morgue.

It was shot on a budget of $600, on a Panasonic HVX200 digital video camera with special effects created in Adobe After Effects, and edited on Final Cut Pro.  It was not stated if the budget included equipment, software costs or salaries for the 30-day shoot.

Plot
The movie itself is presented as being a trailer for a 9 hour long movie. It starts with a voice-over, telling the viewer that: "some murders take seconds; some murders take minutes; some murders take hours; this murder... will take years!".

The movie portrays the story of a forensic pathologist called Jack Cucchiaio (played by Paul Clemens; "cucchiaio" means spoon in Italian), who finds himself being haunted by a deranged-looking man (Brian Rohan), who is, without any clear reason, hitting him with a spoon. No one seems to believe this though as the mysterious attacker only shows up when Jack is alone.  He is seen developing a phobia of spoons, stirring his coffee with a fork.

Jack attempts to defend himself - stabbing the murderer in the throat with a kitchen knife. But to Jack's surprise his enemy turns out to be immortal, pulling the knife out of his throat and throwing it away, then continuing to hit Jack with the spoon. However, in this scene Jack also notices a strange sign on the arm of his attacker.

Jack travels to the far East where he learns that his attacker is known as the Ginosaji ("silver spoon" in Japanese), an immortal and unstoppable being. It searches for a victim to terrorise and slowly kill by repeatedly hitting them with a spoon. The Ginosaji will follow Jack to the ends of the Earth, and it will never stop attacking Jack until he is dead. After this, Jack is shown travelling around the world, trying to escape from the Ginosaji or to fight it. He uses various weapons, including dynamite, guns, and an RPG. Since the Ginosaji is immortal, however, he will always survive and find Jack again. The last scene shows a weakened, wounded Jack, crawling in the desert, with the Ginosaji still striking him with the spoon. Then, suddenly, the spoon breaks. However, Jack's final hope is brief as the Ginosaji opens his jacket and shows dozens of spoons. Finally, the title and credits are shown in typical trailer style.

Sequels
A sequel, Spoon Vs. Spoon was later released on YouTube, in which Jack takes on the advice of a viewer to fight back with another spoon. This, however, backfired as the Ginosaji took away Jack's other spoon, and mercilessly used the second spoon for double-hitting. The Ginosaji has since used dual weapons with two spoons.

Another sequel, Save Jack, was also released in the form of a game in which the player has to choose what Jack Cucchiaio should do, choices involving wearing protective clothing, using a giant magnet, giving the Ginosaji a hug or kicking it in the crotch. All of these choices backfired horrendously, making the situation more tormentingly difficult. The only one which almost succeeded was the magnet one. Unfortunately, the Ginosaji had a wooden spoon.

A third sequel was named Spoon Wars and featured a duel between Jack (as a Jedi and armed with a blue lightsaber) and the Ginosaji (as a Sith armed with a spoon). The Ginosaji's spoon seemed to be made of an anti-lightsaber alloy. The duel eventually ended in the water when Jack was killed and then woke up from the dream. At first he thought that the whole Ginosaji thing was a dream, but he was proven wrong when the Ginosaji attacked him again.

A fourth sequel, Ginosaji Vs. Ginosaji, featured Jack attempting to convince the Ginosaji not to attack him since he is another Ginosaji. Wearing make-up and a hoodie, Jack attacks another person with a spoon, but the person hits Jack instead and the Ginosaji is not convinced. An injured Jack tries to commit suicide by jumping in front of a bus, but instead gets attached to it and is dragged by the bus for a while. After getting loose, an insane old woman tries to kill him very slowly by hitting him with a cane whilst the Ginosaji also hits him with a spoon. Jack is knocked out as a passer-by tries to keep the old woman at bay, and finds himself in his 'Happy Place', where he meets the 'Happy Squirrel' who tries to motivate him. Jack then wakes up in a hospital where the nurse turns into the Ginosaji and chases Jack to the top of the hospital. Then, he attempts suicide by throwing himself off of the hospital roof. When he falls, he hits a fat woman who dies. The Happy Squirrel then tells Jack who is then admitted in the hospital that he won't be seeing him anymore. After a year of recovering, Jack tries again to make up himself as the Ginosaji, but far more convincingly. The fight happens in the Gobi Desert, where Jack loses and tries to kill the Happy Squirrel.  Angry at Jack's betrayal, the Happy Squirrel urinates in Jack's face and runs off. At the end of the last video of Ginosaji vs Ginosaji, Richard Gale announces that there will be a real film of the story, which will be called GINOSAJI - The Horribly Slow Murderer With The Extremely Inefficient Weapon.

Feature film
Richard Gale confirmed he will be writing and directing a feature film based on his original short. On September 10, 2015, a 55-day Kickstarter  crowdfunding campaign was launched by Richard Gale to help fund a real feature-length motion picture based on his short.  The campaign was cancelled prior to completion, having raised over $100,000 in pledges.   Gale launched a second campaign with a more modest $50,000 goal stating that he would  receive partial funding from private investors but needed the additional crowd sourced funds to produce the movie.

References

External links
Richard Gale Films website

2008 films
2008 horror films
2008 comedy horror films
American comedy horror films
American horror short films
American comedy short films
American slasher films
Spoons
2008 comedy films
Films shot in California
2000s English-language films
2000s American films